Robert Sandifer (March 12, 1983 – September 1, 1994) (also known as Yummy) was an 11-year-old boy from Chicago, Illinois. His murder by fellow gang members in Chicago garnered national attention because of his age, resulting in his appearance on the cover of Time magazine in September 1994. His nickname originates from his love for cookies. Standing 137 cm (4 ft 6 in), Sandifer was a young member of the Chicago street gang the Black Disciples (BD).

After committing murder, arson and armed robbery, he was murdered by his own fellow gang members who feared he could become an informant, and that he was attracting too much attention towards their activities. Coverage of Sandifer's death and retrospectives on his short, violent life were widely published in the American media. Sandifer became a symbol of the gang problem in American inner cities, the failure of social safety nets, and the shortcomings of the juvenile justice system.

Early life 
Robert Sandifer was born in Chicago, Illinois, on March 12, 1983. Sandifer's mother, Lorina Sandifer, had over 30 arrests while prostituting, many of which were drug-related. Sandifer's father, Robert Akins, was absent throughout Sandifer's life due to incarceration for a felony gun charge. Sandifer was physically abused from the time he was an infant.

Before he was three years old, Sandifer was already known to the Department of Children and Family Services (DCFS). Physical examinations showed that Sandifer was alleged to have had cigarette burns on his arms and neck as well as linear bruising consistent with physical beatings. Lorina initially blamed the abuse on Sandifer's father, although she later recanted.

In 1987, Sandifer and his siblings were removed from his mother's home by DCFS and were sent to live with their grandmother in the Roseland neighborhood of Chicago. His grandmother's residence contained as many as 19 children on some occasions. By most accounts, his grandmother's home was not much better than Sandifer's previous home.

Sandifer, by the age of eight, quit attending school and began to roam the streets stealing cars and breaking into houses. At the age of ten, Sandifer was arrested on charges of armed robbery. A psychological examiner at the time reported that "Robert is a child growing up without any encouragement and support," and that he "has a sense of failure that has infiltrated almost every aspect of his inner self."

In 1993, Sandifer and his siblings were removed from his grandmother's home and were sent to the Lawrence Hall DCFS shelter on Chicago's North Side, from which Sandifer ran away and never returned. From 1993 until his death, Sandifer's whereabouts and living arrangements remain unclear, although he continued to be arrested by the authorities.

Murder of Shavon Dean 
On August 28, 1994, Sandifer was ordered to do a favor for his gang. He opened fire several times with a 9-millimeter semiautomatic pistol, striking several youths. Sandifer quickly fled the scene. Among his victims was a 14-year-old girl, Shavon Dean, who was fatally hit by a stray bullet.

Death
After the shooting, the police were looking for Sandifer who was hiding with gang members in the neighborhood.
On August 31, while standing on a neighbor's porch after asking to call his grandmother, Sandifer was met by brothers Cragg and Derrick Hardaway, ages 16 and 14, who were both members of the Black Disciples street gang. Sandifer was told he was being taken to a safe location out of town and ordered into a waiting car.

Instead, he was taken to a railroad underpass at East 108th Street and South Dauphin Avenue and told to get on his knees. While kneeling, Sandifer was shot twice in the back of the head by the Hardaway brothers. Sandifer's body was discovered by the Chicago Police Department in the early morning of September 1.

Around 400 people attended Sandifer's funeral, which was held at the Youth Center Church of God in Christ on Chicago's Northwest Side.

The Hardaway brothers were later convicted of Sandifer's murder. Derrick received a 45-year sentence and Cragg received a 60-year sentence. Derrick was released from prison in December 2016. Cragg was released from prison in December 2020.

In popular media 
 Yummy: the Last Days of a Southside Shorty, a graphic novel

See also 

 African-American organized crime

References 

1983 births
1994 deaths
1994 murders in the United States
People murdered by African-American organized crime
Gang members
Murder committed by minors
Murdered American children
People murdered in Illinois
Male murder victims
Murdered African-American people
Deaths by firearm in Illinois
Incidents of violence against boys